Sure thing or Sure Thing may refer to:

 Certainty
 A Sure Thing, a 1962 album by jazz trumpeter Blue Mitchell
 The Sure Thing, a 1985 romantic comedy directed by Rob Reiner
 Sure Thing (play), a 1988 short play by David Ives
 Sure Thing (short story), a short novel by Isaac Asimov
 "Sure Thing" (Foster & Lloyd song), 1987
 "Sure Thing" (Miguel song), 2011
 "Sure Thing" (Hillsong United song), 2021
 "Sure Thing", a song by St Germain
 "Sure Thing", a song by Jerome Kern and Ira Gershwin, for the film Cover Girl